Gertrude Bourdon (ca 1955) is a Canadian health professional and politician.

Bourdon was educated at the Polyvalente de Saint-Prosper and the Cégep Limoilou. She went on to study nursing at the Université Laval and public administration at the École nationale d'administration publique. In 2009, she was named director general for the Centre hospitalier universitaire de Québec (CHUQ). In 2012, she was responsible for the union of the Centre hospitalier affilié universitaire de Québec with the CHUQ. She then became president/director-general of the amalgamated network of hospitals. She resigned her position in August 2018 to run for political office. Bourdon was recognized as one of Canada's Top 100 most influential women by the Women's Executive Network in 2014. She was awarded the Prix Rachel-Bureau by the Ordre régional des infirmières et infirmiers de Québec. In 2018, she was named an Officer in the Order of Canada.

Following her resignation, Bourdon announced that she would run as a Quebec Liberal Party candidate in the riding of Jean-Lesage in the 2018 Quebec general election. She had already refused an offer to run as a candidate for the Coalition Avenir Québec. It was announced that she would become Minister of Health if the Liberals formed the next government in Quebec. On 1 October 2018, Bourdon lost her election (5,305 votes) to Sol Zanetti (QS 10,304) where she came in third place behind Christiane Gamache (CAQ- 9,635)

Electoral records

References 

Living people
Université Laval alumni
Canadian hospital administrators
Officers of the Order of Canada
Quebec Liberal Party candidates in Quebec provincial elections
Year of birth missing (living people)